Global Entrepreneurship Week (GEW) is an international initiative that introduces entrepreneurship to young people in six continents. GEW emerged in 2008 as a result of Enterprise Week UK and Entrepreneurship Week USA 2007. Since its creation, more than 10 million people from roughly 170 countries have participated in entrepreneurship-related events, activities and competitions during GEW.

This annual event occurs over the span of one week and includes the participation of millions of entrepreneurs, investors, policymakers, researchers, educators, entrepreneurship support organizations and interested individuals. Currently, 165 countries celebrate Global Entrepreneurship Week running national campaigns that generate approximately 35,000 events, activities and competitions.

Supporters

Founders
The Ewing Marion Kauffman Foundation is a non-profit foundation based in Kansas City, Missouri, established in the mid-1960s by the late entrepreneur and philanthropist Ewing Marion Kauffman. The Kauffman Foundation’s mission is to create “a society of economically independent individuals who are engaged citizens, contributing to the improvement of their communities.” Their two main areas of focus are: advancing entrepreneurship and improving the education of children and youth.

Enterprise Week UK is Enterprise UK's campaign to connect youth, women, homeworkers, people from ethnic minorities to entrepreneurial opportunities. It was founded in 2004 by the British Chambers of Commerce, the Confederation of British Industry, the Institute of Directors and the Federation of Small Businesses.

Hosts

Each country that participates in Global Entrepreneurship Week designates a host organization to lead the campaign (in rare instances, two or more organizations share this responsibility). Host organizations are responsible for galvanizing the momentum of their national GEW campaign—building a network of partner organizations to run events and activities during GEW and supporters to help promote the national campaign. Below is a list of participating countries, along with some of their past respective host organization(s).

Global partners

A global partner is any organization that agrees to host one or more activities during Global Entrepreneurship Week. These organizations include:
Business Council for International Understanding (BCIU)
Department for Business, Innovation and Skills, UK
DECA
Endeavor
Junior Achievement
Entrepreneurs' Organization
National Foundation for Teaching Entrepreneurship (NFTE)
TechnoServe
European Confederation of Young Entrepreneurs (YES for Europe)
Youth Entrepreneurship and Sustainability (YES, Inc.)
The Prince's Youth Business International

Activities
4th annual Race to Entrepreneurship: This event is held by the St. Louis Regional Entrepreneurship Educators (STLREE). Teams must “think like an entrepreneur” as they follow a packet of clues and use public transportation to locate and photograph entrepreneurial landmarks in St. Louis.
NFTE students at Shaw High School in East Cleveland, Ohio compete in the GoVenture Lemonade Stand business simulation after-school.  They record their scores after select "open days" and the top earners win a prize.
University of Virginia Cup Entrepreneurial Concept Competition: Students submit a 3 page "business concept" and compete in the first round against students within their school or department. In the second round, the winners from each school or department compete against one another until a winning team receives the UVA Cup. Heads of schools can participate in a bet, the one who loses gets his/her head shaved on The Lawn. Additional competitions at UVA include YouTube video submissions, designs for the UVA Cup Trophy, and ideas for “game-changing”.
Youth Lunch'N Learn: This event is hosted by the Asset Building Center. Local entrepreneurs share success stories and business-starting fundamentals to an audience of students.
Youthpreneur: KooDooZ holds this program for 5th through 10th graders challenges them to make a social impact through tried methodologies. The students’ progress will be documented and interactive online webinars will be posted on KooDooZ's YouTube channel.

Official events
The Global Cleantech Open Ideas Competition: A challenge created for green innovators. The goal of the competition is to produce clean technology ideas and collaborate with investors and CEO’s. The winning idea receives $100,000 in legal, marketing, and public relations support.
551 Speednetwork the Globe: A networking event hosted by YES for Europe in which entrepreneurs meet and speak with others in timed intervals to brainstorm and share ideas.
Mentoring Madness: An event sponsored by NYSE Euronext. Students posed their entrepreneurial questions to a panel headed by Snoop Dogg. Winners were awarded $25,000 in startup funds.
The Global Innovation Tournament: An event targeted towards saving money. Teams were asked to create innovated ideas to make saving money fun. Ideas were judged on innovation and novelty of the idea, how fun it was, and whether the idea created a positive impact.

Logo
The GEW logo is multi-colored compass with rounded typeface of ‘Global Entrepreneurship Week’ coming from the top right section. The color spectrum, which includes 26 colors, represents GEW’s international span. The compass shape adheres to the notion of navigation and the direction of entrepreneurship in the future. Many of GEW’s partners fuse their own logo with the compass in order to demonstrate a joint collaboration towards a global initiative.

See also
Global Startup Battle

References

Entrepreneurship organizations
Awareness weeks
November observances